is a 1993 action role-playing game by Hudson Soft for the PC Engine CD-ROM². It is the fourth game in the Ys video game series. The Dawn of Ys was one of two games released under the title of Ys IV, the other being Tonkin House's Ys IV: Mask of the Sun for the Super Famicom. The two games share the same setting, but Hudson took more liberties with its presentation in The Dawn of Ys, and two unique games resulted.

Plot
Ys IV takes place two years after the events of Ys II, and before the events of Ys III: Wanderers from Ys. As the game begins, Adol has returned to the town of Minea, where Ys I began. After hanging around for a while and conversing with old friends, he decides to set sail for the overseas land of Celceta.

Gameplay
Ys IV returns to the style of play used in Ys I and II. The gameplay area is viewed from a top-down perspective, and the player attacks enemies by running into them to cause damage. Adol gains experience from defeating enemies, and gaining experience serves to raise his strength, as in the previous games. The Magic system introduced in Ys II is also brought back for this game.

Development 
Ys series creators Nihon Falcom licensed its development to Hudson Soft.

The original music was composed by Falcom Sound Team J.D.K. members Atsushi Shirakawa, Naoki Kaneda, Takahiro Tsunashima, and Masaru Nakajima. As was the case with Hudson's CD-ROM² versions of Ys I & II and Ys III: Wanderers from Ys, The Dawn of Ys CD-DA tracks were arranged by Ryo Yonemitsu. Yonemitsu did not arrange the entire soundtrack for the game itself, as many tracks were programmed for the console's internal sound chip by Osamu Narita, but he did cover every track for the Perfect Collection Ys IV CD series. (see below)

Reception 
Japanese game magazine Famitsu gave the game a score of 29 out of 40.

French magazine Joypad gave it 96%.

References

External links

1993 video games
Action role-playing video games
Japan-exclusive video games
Single-player video games
TurboGrafx-CD games
TurboGrafx-CD-only games
Video games developed in Japan
Video games set in forests
Ys (series)